A cataract is an opacity in the lens of the eye or its capsule.

Cataract also may refer to:
Cataract, any large, powerful waterfall
Cataract (beam engine), governor used for early steam engines
Jehu (or John) O'Cataract, two pen names for John Neal (1793-1876)
 Shawinigan Cataractes, ice-hockey team

Places

Cataract Gorge, river gorge on Tasmania, off Australia

Egypt 
Cataracts of the Nile
Old Cataract Hotel, a hotel in Aswan, Egypt

Canada 
Cataract, Ontario

United States 
Cataract, Indiana
Cataract, Wisconsin
Cataract Canyon, a 46-mile-long canyon on the Colorado River in Utah

Music

Performing groups 
The Cataracs, Berkeley, California hip hop duo
 Cataract (band), European metalcore band from Switzerland

Works
 Cataract (Cataract album), by the eponymous band
 Songs:
 "Cataract,"  by Sparta on  album Wiretap Scars (2002)
"Cataracts",  by Andrew Bird on  album Armchair Apocrypha (2007)